Proprioseiopsis dentatus is a species of mite in the family Phytoseiidae.

References

dentatus
Articles created by Qbugbot
Animals described in 1979